This is a list of international trade organizations, the largest being the World Trade Organization.

List of trade organizations 

Trade
Business organizations